Ângelo Carlos Muniz (1 January 1798 – 4 May 1863) was a Brazilian politician who served as a senator in the Empire of Brazil from 1852 until his death.
Prior to that, he was Governor of Maranhão for three non-consecutive terms.

References

1798 births
1863 deaths
Members of the Senate of the Empire of Brazil
Governors of Maranhão (Empire of Brazil)